Harold Allison (born 10 July 1930) was an Australian politician who represented the South Australian House of Assembly seats of Mount Gambier from 1975 to 1993 and Gordon from 1993 to 1997 for the Liberal Party.

References

 

Members of the South Australian House of Assembly
1930 births
Living people
Liberal Party of Australia members of the Parliament of South Australia